Tianhe International Airport Station, is a station on Line 2 of Wuhan Metro and it is the northern terminus of Line 2. It entered revenue service on December 28, 2016. It is located in Huangpi District and it serves Wuhan Tianhe International Airport.

Station layout

Gallery

References

Wuhan Metro stations
Line 2, Wuhan Metro
Railway stations in China opened in 2016